Roger Keith Coulam, (born 21 August 1940, Blackburn, Lancashire, England, died October 2005), was a British keyboard session musician, who formed Blue Mink in the autumn of 1969, with Madeline Bell (vocalist), Roger Cook (vocalist), Alan Parker (guitarist), Herbie Flowers (bassist), and Barry Morgan (drummer).

Career
Through his career, Coulam has also been involved with:
Robert Priddy trio at the Grotto Club, Baker Street
The Roger Coulam Quartet (1967)
The Shubdubs / Jimmy Nicol & The Shubdubs (Jimmie Nicol; Johnny Harris)
Don Partridge (1968)
Matthews' Southern Comfort
Matthews' Southern Comfort (1969) 
Je t'aime... moi non plus (1969, Jane Birkin and Serge Gainsbourg version)
Poet and the One Man Band (1969) (Heads Hands & Feet; Johnny Harris; Albert Lee; Jerry Donahue; Fotheringay)
CCS
Ugly Custard (1970)
Later That Same Year (1971)
Billie Davis (1970)
Histoire de Melody Nelson (1971)
Where Did They Go (1972, Sandie Shaw version)
Georgia Brown (1972)
Jesus Christ Superstar (1973 Film Soundtrack)
Typically Tropical (1975)
Nick Ingman (1976 & 2006)
Alan Price (2001)

Credits
Allmusic.com lists Coulam with 31 credits from 1969 to 2012. Discogs.com list 41 from 1965 to 2010.

References

External links
Biography, feenotes.com

1944 births
2005 deaths
People from Blackburn
Blue Mink members
CCS (band) members
English session musicians